Točná Airport (ICAO airport code LKTC) is a private domestic airport in Točná, Prague 12 in the Czech Republic.

The airport opened as a recreational glider airport on March 31, 1946.

After 1989, the runway was shortened to 550 meters due to disputes with landowners.

In 2008, the airport was purchased by Ivo Lukačovič.  The service buildings were rebuilt, the property secured by a fence, a museum and public playground were added, and the runway was lengthened to 870 meters.

Aircraft 

On the Točná Airport, there is a museum, and some with planes there too. Museum is opened for people and the entry is completely free. Planes of the museum are on this list.

Lockheed Model 10 Electra of Tomáš Baťa (1876–1932), Czech shoe company founder

Waco YPF

North American T-6 Texan

Avia BH-1

Avia BH-5

Hawker Hurricane

References

External links 
 Točná Airport Web

Airports in the Czech Republic
1946 establishments in Czechoslovakia
Airports established in 1946
20th-century architecture in the Czech Republic